A scrambler is a telecommunications device that transposes or inverts signals or otherwise encodes a message.

Scrambler may also refer to:
Scrambler (ride), a type of amusement ride
Scrambler mouse, a mouse mutant lacking a functional DAB1 gene

Automobiles
CJ-8 Scrambler, a Jeep CJ variant produced from 1978 to 1983
SC/Rambler, a muscle car made by American Motors in 1969

Motorcycles
Scrambler (motorcycle), for motocross racing
Triumph Scrambler, a model introduced in 2006
Ducati Scrambler, a model originally built in 1962-1974
Ducati Scrambler (2015), reintroduced in 2015

See also
Scramble (disambiguation)